Grey Alien Games is an indie English video game developer based in Dorset. It is jointly owned by Jake Birkett and his wife and fellow game developer, Helen Carmichael.

They are specialized in Role-playing video game Solitaire card video games.

The company's 2020 title Ancient Enemy , created in collaboration with Jim Rossignol and supported by Bithell Games, received an Honourable Mention for game design at the 2021 Independent Games Festival

In 2021, Grey Alien Games collaborated with Dejobaan Games on T-Minus 30, a fast-paced city builder for PC. It also launched historical casual card title Regency Solitaire on the Nintendo Switch. Helen Carmichael also collaborated on narrative for Foxy Voxel for its early access game, Going Medieval. 

The company is currently working on a city builder game.

Games developed

References

External links 
 

Video game companies of the United Kingdom
Video game development companies
Video game companies established in 2004
British companies established in 2004